The Virgin Mobile Slider Sonic (KX5B), is a Mobile phone made by Kyocera, and the successor to the Virgin Mobile Slider. The Slider Sonic is a music-oriented phone aimed at teens.

Features include:
 Music player that supports WMA and MP3 audio formats
 Free embedded music videos from Seether, Submersed and Breaking Benjamin
 Access to thousands of Superphonic Ringtones (real-music ringtones)
 Downloadable instant messaging through AOL
 Video recorder with playback
 Camera phone with flash and two-way picture messaging
 Exclusive *MTV content
 WAP 2.0 browser
 Text messaging

Kyocera SE44

The Kyocera SE44, referred to as the Kyocera Slider, is the first slider-style phone from Kyocera.

Other technical data include:
 Form Factor: Slider
 Extendable Antenna
 Battery Life: Talk: 4 hours, Standby: 180 hours

Carriers
The phone has been distributed in North America by the following carriers:
 Alltel (United States)
 Bell Mobility (Canada)
 Cricket Communications (United States)
 US Cellular (United States)
 Verizon Wireless (United States)
 Virgin Mobile (United States)

Kyocera SE47

The Kyocera SE47 is the Slider model that was released as a digital only version. The SE44 was later released as a tri-mode option.

External links
Kyocera Slider Sonic official page
Kyocera Slider official page
Slider Sonic Virgin Mobile page

Kyocera mobile phones